Oreoloma is a genus of flowering plants belonging to the family Brassicaceae.

Its native range is Mongolia to Northern China.

Species:

Oreoloma eglandulosum 
Oreoloma fuhaiense 
Oreoloma grandiflorum 
Oreoloma matthioloides 
Oreoloma violaceum

References

Brassicaceae
Brassicaceae genera
Taxa named by Victor Botchantsev